Rathole may refer to:
 Rathole, Edmonton, a former two-lane tunnel in Edmonton, Alberta, Canada
 removing chips inappropriately from the table in poker
 an audio file archiving tool in Soundfont
 a jingle on the show MacBreak Weekly
 a channel on EFNet IRC
 a method of money laundering
 a section of the Cincinnati, New Orleans and Texas Pacific Railway